Until the 1990s, most Korean Bible translations used old-fashioned, antiquated language. This made it difficult for Christians that preferred colloquial terms to comprehend what the Bible said. By the 1990s, more colloquial and contemporary versions of the Korean Bible translations came about for Christians, which made it easier for them to comprehend and understand the words from the Bible in a more precise way.

Conventional

Prior to 1784
Prior to 1784, the small number of Christians in Korea had used Chinese Bibles, as those were written in Classical Chinese which are shared between the two countries.

Before 1945
1784 - Literal Translated Bible (성경직해) - Roman Catholic. First all Korean language Bible. John the Baptist Choi Chang Hyun (최창현 세례자 요한)'s translation. The main text of The Occidental Sciences Books written in Chinese characters introduced in the Orient (東傳漢文西學書) by Portuguese Jesuit missionary Rev. E. Diaz
1887 - The Ross New Testament (all New testament Books) by John Ross et al., at Dongguan Church in Mukden, Manchuria
1900 - Henry G. Appenzeller New Testament. Methodist Episcopal. Appenzeller's team includes Horace Grant Underwood, William B. Scranton and James Scarth Gale
1910 - Four Gospels (사사성경) by the Roman Catholic Diocese of Korea. Rev. Paul Han Gi Gun (한기근 바오로) and Rev. James Son Sung Jae (손성재 야고보) complete the Gospels from the Vulgate Latin version.
1910 - Korean Bible. William D. Reynolds (레널즈) with Lee Seung Doo (이승두) and Kim Jeong Sam (김정삼) complete the Old Testament.
1922 - The Acts Of The Apostles by the Roman Catholic Diocese of Korea.
1925 - The Gale Bible. James Scarth Gale's private translation
1923 - Fenwick New Testament. Malcolm C. Fenwick (1863–1935)
1938 - Old Korean Revised Version (성경개역) KBS
1941 - The EpistlesㆍApocalypse (신약성서 서간ㆍ묵시편) by Rev. Arnulf Schleicher, O.S.B.

After independence
1958 - Book Of Genesis by Rev. Lawrence Seon Jong Wan (선종완 라우렌시오) of Roman Catholic.
1959 - Books Of ExodusㆍLeviticusㆍNumbersㆍDeuteronomyㆍJoshuaㆍJudgesㆍRuthㆍ1&2 Samuelㆍ1&2 Kings and Prophecy Of Isaias by Rev. Lawrence Seon Jong Wan of Roman Catholic.
1961 - KRV Korean Revised Version (개역한글). This version used to be a standard version for several decades in most Korean Protestant denominations and it was replaced by the New Korean Revised Version in mainstream Korean Protestant denominations in the mid-2000s. However, it is still in use in some conservative minor Protestant denominations. Revised 1998 (성경전서 개역개정판). KBS
1963 - Prophecy&Lamentations Of Jeremias and Prophecy Of Baruch by Rev. Lawrence Seon Jong Wan of Roman Catholic.
1968 - Book Of Psalms by Rev. John Choi Min Sun (최민순 요한) of Roman Catholic.
1977 - CTB Common Translation Bible (공동번역성서 共同翻譯聖書). 1999 Common Translation with minor corrections (공동번역 성서 개정판) KBS. Worked by Catholic priests and liberal Protestant scholars or pastors. This ecumenical translation had been a standard bible for the Roman Catholic Church in Korea from 1977 to 2005. This revised version is used by the Anglican Church of Korea and the Orthodox Church of Korea.
1983/1984 - CTBP Common Translation Bible Pyongyang version (공동번역성서 평양교정본). Produced by the government controlled Korean Christian Association in North Korea, it is based on the CTB. The New Testament was printed in 1983 and the Old Testament in 1984. The revised edition from 1990 contains both in one volume.

Contemporary
1985 - KLB Korean Living Bible (현대인의성경). A Korean re-translation of the Living Bible (생명의 말씀사)
1991 - 200th Year Anniversary Edition of the New Testament (200주년 신약성서) - Waegwan Abbey, revised in 1998
1991 - TKV Today's Korean Version (현대어성경) (성서원)
–1993 - NKSB New Korean Standard Bible, (표준새번역) Its literary style is contemporary. However, due to disputes by conservative evangelicals, it failed to gain the status as the standard lectionary bible in mainstream Korean Protestant churches. rev. 2001 (새번역개정: Revised New Korean Standard Bible) 2004 KBS.
1994 - Agape Easy Bible (아가페 쉬운 성경) Agape Publishers (아가페 출판사)
1998 - NKRV New Korean Revised Version (개역개정) KBS. Some archaic words are revised into contemporary words, but the old-fashioned literary style of the Korean Revised Version is still retained. It is the standard Bible in use in most Korean Protestant denominations, replacing the Korean Revised Version.
1999 - New World Translation (신세계역 성경), abbreviated NWT, produced by Jehovah's Witnesses in contemporary language.
2004 - Woorimal Bible (우리말 성경) (두란노서원)
2005 - (Catholic) Holy Bible (성경) - Catholic Bishops' Conference of Korea (CBCK: 한국천주교주교회의) 2005  This version is the standard Bible for the Roman Catholic Church in Korea since 2005, replacing the Common Translation Bible.
2005 - North Korean Bible (북한말 성경), Cornerstone Ministries (모퉁이돌선교회)
2006 - Braille Bible (점자 성경) - Catholic Bishops' Conference of Korea (CBCK: 한국천주교주교회의) 2006
2008 - Pyongyang Bible (평양말 성경). DPRK orthography and vocabulary differs from ROK usage.
2008 - True Bible (바른 성경), Korean Society of Holy Bible(KSHB : 한국성경공회)
2014 - Revised New World Translation (신세계역 개정판), produced by Jehovah's Witnesses.

Authorization by major denominations
The Holy Bible (성경), translated by the Catholic Bishop's conference in 2005, which became the standard Bible for the Catholic Church in Korea.
Protestant denominations authorize NKRV New Korean Revised Version (개역개정), KRV Korean Revised Version (개역한글), RNSV Revised New Korean Standard Version (새번역), and CTB Common Translation Bible (공동번역) (the order of popularity) for their services. 
The conservative denominations in the Christian Council of Korea commonly authorize KRV Korean Revised Version (개역한글) and NKRV New Korean Revised Version (개역개정). NKRV is more popular for liturgical uses, but due to its old-fashioned style, other versions with the contemporary language are frequently read in the youth services. 
Other mainstream denominations with the liberal affiliations choose RNSV (새번역) as well.
The ecumenical CTB (공동번역), once used in the Catholic Church and a number of protestant churches in the 1990s, lost its popularity as the Catholic Church moves out from using it for liturgical purposes. CTB is now authorized by the Anglican Church of Korea and Korean Orthodox Church.

Comparison

References

External links
Online
 Holy Bible (성경) (Catholic), at CBCK.or.kr
CTB Common Translation Bible (공동번역성서)

Korean
Korean literature